Titus Babczyński (1830 in Warsaw – 1910) was a Polish mathematician and physicist. He graduated from the School of Fine Arts in Warsaw, then studied physics and mathematics. In 1872, he was a doctor at the University of St. Petersburg.
In the period (1857–1862), he was a professor of higher mathematics and mechanics at the School of Fine Arts in Warsaw and eventually the University of Warsaw (1862–1887). He wrote the acclaimed papers: "On the phenomena of induction," which was awarded a gold medal at the University of St. Petersburg, as well as "higher algebra lectures and calculus," "Introduction to higher growth," Method of multiplication and algebraic functions of symmetric rational."

Polish mathematicians
1830 births
1910 deaths
Mathematicians from the Russian Empire